Aditmari is an upazila of Lalmonirhat District in the Division of Rangpur, Bangladesh.

Geography
It has 33343 households and total area 195.03 km2.

Demographics
As of the 1991 Bangladesh census, Aditmari has a population of 176760. Males constitute 51.22% of the population, and females 48.78%. This Upazila's eighteen up population is 84204. Aditmari has an average literacy rate of 18.6% (7+ years), and the national average of 32.4% literate.

Administration
Aditmari Upazila is divided into eight union parishads: Bhadai, Bhelabari, Durgapur, Kamalabari, Mohishkhocha, Palashi, Saptibari, and Sarpukur. The union parishads are subdivided into 56 mauzas and 102 villages.

See also
Upazilas of Bangladesh
Districts of Bangladesh
Divisions of Bangladesh

References

 
Upazilas of Lalmonirhat District